Education Secretary may refer to:
 Cabinet Secretary for Education and Lifelong Learning, Scotland
 Secretary for Education (Hong Kong)
 Secretariat of Public Education (Mexico)
 Secretary of State for Education, United Kingdom
 United States Secretary of Education